Tianchi (天池) may refer to several locations in China:

Lakes 
Heaven Lake primarily refers to the crater lake of Mount Baekdu, on the Sino–North Korean border

Heaven Lake is the translation of a Chinese, Mongolian, Manju, Korean, etc. name of a lake; here "Heaven" may refer to Tian or Tengri here:
 Heaven Lake of Tian Shan, lake in Xinjiang
 Heaven Lake of Arxan, near Arxan City, Inner Mongolia

Places 
 Tianchi, Mianchi County, in Mianchi County, Henan
 Tianchi, Arxan, in Arxan City, Inner Mongolia
 Tianchi, Huaying, in Huaying City, Sichuan
 Tianchi, Lezhi County, in Lezhi County, Sichuan
 Tianchi, Xuyong County, in Xuyong County, Sichuan
 Tianchi Lake, Phoenix Mountains, Wudong Village, Guangdong Province